Mykyta Oleksandrovych Fursenko (born 1 October 2002) is a Ukrainian professional footballer who plays as a centre-back for Ukrainian club Mariupol.

References

External links
 Profile on Mariupol official website
 
 

2002 births
Living people
Place of birth missing (living people)
Ukrainian footballers
Association football defenders
FC Mariupol players
Ukrainian Premier League players